Tomás Agustín Pozzo (born 27 September 2000) is an Argentine professional footballer who plays as a midfielder for Independiente.

Career
Pozzo started his youth career with Club Atlético Calzada, before signing for Banfield at the age of eight - remaining for six years. After leaving them, Pozzo joined Independiente's system. He was promoted into their first-team in November 2020 under manager Lucas Pusineri; having signed his first professional contract in the preceding January. Pozzo's senior debut arrived on 21 November in a goalless draw against Central Córdoba in the Copa de la Liga Profesional, as he replaced Andrés Roa with twelve minutes remaining.

Career statistics
.

Notes

References

External links

2000 births
Living people
People from Adrogué
Argentine people of Italian descent
Argentine footballers
Association football midfielders
Argentine Primera División players
Club Atlético Banfield footballers
Club Atlético Independiente footballers
Sportspeople from Buenos Aires Province